Carlos Vidal Lepe (24 February 1902 – 7 June 1982) was a Chilean football forward who represented the Chile national team at the 1930 FIFA World Cup.

International goals
Chile's goal tally first

References

External links

1902 births
1982 deaths
Chilean footballers
Chile international footballers
Audax Italiano footballers
1930 FIFA World Cup players
Association football forwards